This is a list of trade unions in Germany, which play an important part of German labour law and European labour law.

Trade union federations
The Deutscher Gewerkschaftsbund, established 1949, is the most important union organisation. After many mergers it only now consists of 8 trade unions. It mediates inter-union disputes and organises member unions so they do not impede on each other's membership. It follows the  principle. In its substantive politics it is aligned mostly with the SPD. Members are not bound by DGB policies. The representation in the DGB is democratic, so in practice IG Metall and ver.di dominate the agenda and policy with the most members.

Individual unions
There are 8 unions, following a long series of mergers, affiliated to the largest German trade union confederation, the Deutsche Gewerkschaftsbund (DGB).

There are 39 trade unions under the Deutsche Beamte Bund (dbb).

There are 14 unions affiliated to the Christlicher Gewerkschaftsbund.

There are a number of other, non-affiliated unions with a total of between 200,000 and 300,000 members.

Deutsche Angestellten Gewerkschaft (DAG) German Salaried Employees' Union (part of DGB since 2001)
KabineKlar  German Flight Attendants Union
FAU Free Workers' Union is the primary anarcho-syndicalist union in Germany.
 (doctors' union)

See also
 List of trade unions in France
 List of trade unions in the United Kingdom
 List of trade unions in the United States
 List of unions
 Jugend- und Auszubildendenvertretung, a statutory young employees' organisation
Works council

References

Lists of trade unions
Trade unions